Maqsood Ebne Aziz Lama is a Bangladeshi Jatiya Party politician and former Member of Parliament from Sylhet-2.

Career 
Maqsood Ebne Aziz Lama was elected to Parliament in 1988 and 1991 from Sylhet-2 as a Jatiya Party candidate.

References

External links 
List of 4th Parliament Members -Jatiya Sangsad (Bangla) 
List of 5th Parliament Members- Jatiya Sangsad (Bangla)

Living people
People from Sylhet District
Jatiya Party politicians
4th Jatiya Sangsad members
5th Jatiya Sangsad members
Year of birth missing (living people)